Roy Stanley John Crisp (30 September 1890 – 13 February 1966) was an Australian rules footballer who played with Collingwood in the Victorian Football League (VFL).

Notes

External links 

Roy Crisp's profile at Collingwood Forever

1890 births
1966 deaths
Australian rules footballers from Melbourne
Collingwood Football Club players
People from Collingwood, Victoria